Joseph Andrew Williams (born May 2, 1974) is an American prelate of the Roman Catholic Church who has been serving as an auxiliary bishop for the Archdiocese of Saint Paul and Minneapolis in Minnesota since 2021.

Biography
Joseph Williams was born on May 2, 1974, in Minneapolis, Minnesota. He earned a Bachelor of Arts degree at the University of Minnesota and the Franciscan University of Steubenville in Steubenville, Ohio.  He also has a Master of Divinity degree from the University of St. Thomas and the Saint Paul Seminary, both in St. Paul, Minnesota. 

Williams was ordained to the priesthood by Archbishop Harry Flynn on May 28, 2002. 

Pope Francis appointed Williams as an auxiliary bishop for the Archdiocese of Saint Paul and Minneapolis on December 10, 2021. On January 25, 2022, Williams was consecrated as bishop by Archbishop Bernard Hebda.

See also

 Catholic Church hierarchy
 Catholic Church in the United States
 Historical list of the Catholic bishops of the United States
 List of Catholic bishops of the United States
 Lists of patriarchs, archbishops, and bishops

References

External links
Roman Catholic Archdiocese of Saint Paul and Minneapolis Official Site

Episcopal succession

 

1974 births
Living people
American Roman Catholic priests
Bishops appointed by Pope Francis
Clergy from Minneapolis
University of Minnesota alumni
Franciscan University of Steubenville alumni
University of St. Thomas (Minnesota) alumni